The 2022–23 NCAA Division III men's ice hockey season began on October 19, 2021, and concluded on March 25, 2023. This was the 50th season of Division III college ice hockey.

Regular season
Alvernia played its inaugural season this year, doing so as a member of the UCHC.

Standings

Note: Mini-game are not included in final standings

PairWise Rankings
The PairWise Rankings (PWR) are a statistical tool designed to approximate the process by which the NCAA selection committee decides which teams get at-large bids to the 16-team NCAA tournament. Although the NCAA selection committee does not use the PWR as presented by USCHO, the PWR has been accurate in predicting which teams will make the tournament field.
	
For Division III men, all teams are included in comparisons starting in the 2013–14 season (formerly, only teams with a Ratings Percentage Index of .500 or above, or teams under consideration, were included). The PWR method compares each team with every other such team, with the winner of each “comparison” earning one PWR point. After all comparisons are made, the points are totaled up and rankings listed accordingly.
	
With 84 Division III men's teams, the greatest number of PWR points any team could earn is 83, winning the comparison with every other team. Meanwhile, a team that lost all of its comparisons would have no PWR points.

Teams are then ranked by PWR point total, with ties broken by the teams’ RPI ratings, which starting in 2013–14 is weighted for home and road games and includes a quality wins bonus (QWB) for beating teams in the top 20 of the RPI (it also is weighted for home and road).
	
When it comes to comparing teams, the PWR uses three criteria which are combined to make a comparison: RPI, record against common opponents and head-to-head competition. Starting in 2013–14, the comparison of record against teams under consideration was dropped because all teams are now under comparison.

2023 NCAA Tournament

See also
 2022–23 NCAA Division I men's ice hockey season
 2022–23 NCAA Division II men's ice hockey season

References

External links

 
NCAA